Temeleuți is a village in Florești District, Moldova.

References

Villages of Florești District